Lise Søndergaard  (born 27 October 1973) is a Danish women's international footballer who plays as a defender or midfielder. She is a member of the Denmark women's national football team. She was part of the team at the 1999 FIFA Women's World Cup and at the UEFA Women's Euro 2001. On club level she plays for HEI Aarhus in Denmark.

References

1973 births
Living people
VSK Aarhus (women) players
Danish women's footballers
Denmark women's international footballers
Place of birth missing (living people)
Women's association football midfielders
1999 FIFA Women's World Cup players
Women's association football defenders